Del Marquis (born Derek Gruen on August 31, 1977) is an American musician and the lead guitarist for the American group Scissor Sisters. He is also the creator and producer of the American group Slow Knights.

Scissor Sisters
Born in New York City, he was introduced to the Scissor Sisters in 2001 at the insistence of a friend who, at the time, was dating Jake Shears. He originally dismissed the band when he first saw them perform at The Cock, a New York City gay bar.

Solo career
Gruen produced the DVD Kuvaputki released in 2008 by Embryoroom director Edward Quist about Finnish noise artists Pan Sonic.

On Halloween 2008, he began releasing solo material, starting with the song "Hot House", only available with a digital film from his official site. The video was made by Embryoroom, the same director who made Kuvaputki. Further to this, on November 6 it was announced that Del was to digitally release a series of solo EPs, with one released the first Tuesday of every month from December 2008 to April 2009. These contained collaborations with Joan As Police Woman and Basement Jaxx. The first EP, titled Hothouse, was released on December 2. The Runaround EP was released in September 2009, and includes remixes from Baron von Luxxury and Lifelike. The other EPs were titled Character Assassination, and Litter to Society, each with an accompanying videos by Embryoroom.

Gruen & Boys Choir of Harlem alumnus Xavier - credited as Del x Xavier, who would later join Slow Knights, collaborated on an EP titled Tickle. It was released online as a free download in February 2013.

Del Marquis was included on a list of openly gay entertainers in The Advocates "Forty Under 40" issue of June/July 2009.

Slow Knights
After Scissor Sisters announced their hiatus in 2012, Gruen founded a five-person collective that became Slow Knights. They released two albums, Cosmos on March 26, 2013; and Living in a Dark World on April 20, 2015.

Personal life
Gruen is of German, Irish, Polish and Austrian descent, though his great grandfather was born in Riga. He is formally trained as a furniture designer.

References

External links

Embryoroom Official Site

1977 births
Living people
American people of Latvian descent
American rock guitarists
American male guitarists
American LGBT singers
American LGBT songwriters
Scissor Sisters members
Songwriters from New York (state)
American gay musicians
Gay singers
Gay songwriters
LGBT people from New York (state)
Guitarists from New York City
20th-century American LGBT people
21st-century LGBT people